Langue sacrée, langue parlée (tr. Leshon Kodesh Sfat Chol, literally "Sacred Tongue, Profane Language") is a 2008 French independent underground experimental documentary art film directed by Nurith Aviv.

Synopsis
The film, the second in a trilogy, containing Misafa Lesafa (2004) and Traduire (2011), deals with what became of Hebrew, the sacred language of the Jews for two millennia, that became a living language on the creation of the State of Israel in 1948. The film continues the reflection begun in the director's previous film, Misafa Lesafa (2004), which films writers and artists recounting the conflicting relationship that they themselves experienced between their parents' language and the Hebrew language. It was screened more in France than in Israel.

References

External links
Langue sacrée, langue parlée at Nurith Aviv's Official Website 
Langue sacrée, langue parlée's Script at Nurith Aviv's Official Website 

2000s avant-garde and experimental films
2008 documentary films
2008 independent films
2008 films
Documentary films about education
Documentary films about Israel
Documentary films about women
Documentary films about words and language
Films about educators
Films directed by Nurith Aviv
Films set in Israel
Films shot in Israel
French avant-garde and experimental films
French documentary films
French independent films
2000s Hebrew-language films
2000s French films